Apolo Municipality is the first municipal section of the Franz Tamayo Province in the  La Paz Department, Bolivia. Its seat is Apolo.

Apolo Municipality is bordered to the east by Beni Department, San Buenaventura and Palos Blancos Municipalities, to the west by Peru and Pelechuco Municipality, to the north by Ixiamas and San Buenaventura Municipalities and to the south by Teoponte, Guanay, Mapiri and Charazani Municipalities.

Division 
Apolo Municipality is subdivided into the following five cantons:
 Apolo - 6,951 inhabitants (2001)
 Atén - 3,573 inhabitants  
 Mojos - 56 inhabitants
 Pata - 454 inhabitants
 Santa Cruz del Valle Ameno - 2,141 inhabitants

Places of interest 
Some of the tourist attractions of the municipalities are:
 San Juan de Asariamas dry forest in Apolo Canton. The dominant trees species are the Bilka (Anadenanthera macrocarpa), the Cuchi (Astronium urundeuva), and the Brazilian Soto (Schinopsis brasiliensis). 
 Machariapo River in Apolo Canton situated within Madidi National Park and Area of Integrated Management 
 the Inca bridge in Santa Teresa community and the Chiara Alto waterfall of 18 m height in Apolo Canton
 the community of Pata, its old church and the Sillakunka tunnel in Pata Canton
 the valley of the community of Virgen del Rosario, also named Tuichi, in Pata Canton at the shores of Tuichi River
 the community of Santa Cruz del Valle Ameno, the Billipiza waterfall of 22 m height in Vaquería and the archaeological site near Inca Viewpoint in Santa Cruz del Valle Ameno Canton
 Trinity festivity (Santísima Trinidad) in the community of Atén
 the pre-Columbian trails
 Turiapo River and its waterfall in the community of Pucasucho
 Ayara waterfall of about 18 m height in the community of Munaypatac

References 

 www.ine.gov.bo / census 2001: Apolo Municipality

External links 
 Apolo Municipality: population data and map

Municipalities of La Paz Department (Bolivia)